The Women's Western Amateur is an amateur golf tournament for women. It is organized by the Women's Western Golf Association, which also organized the Women's Western Open from 1930 to 1967. It is one of the oldest women's amateur tournaments in the United States, having been played since 1901. Like many other amateur tournaments, it uses a stroke play qualifier to determine the final match play field.

Winners

2022 Taglao Jeeravivitaporn
2021 Marissa Wenzler
2020 Brigitte Thibault
2019 Sarah Shipley
2018 Emilee Hoffman
2017 Maddie Szeryk
2016 Jillian Hollis
2015 Fai Khamborn
2014 Mika Liu
2013 Ashlan Ramsey
2012 Ariya Jutanugarn
2011 Victoria Tanco
2010 Jaclyn Jansen
2009 Taylore Karle
2008 Jennie Arseneault
2007 Mallory Blackwelder
2006 Stacy Lewis
2005 Jennifer Hong
2004 Sophia Sheridan
2003 Brittany Lang
2002 Janice Olivencia
2001 Meredith Duncan
2000 Meredith Duncan
1999 Kellee Booth
1998 Grace Park
1997 Stephanie Keever
1996 Mary Burkhardt Shields
1995 Cristie Kerr
1994 Stephanie Neill
1993 Stephanie Sparks
1992 Moira Dunn
1991 Sarah LeBrun Ingram
1990 Patricia Cornett Iker
1989 Katie Peterson
1988 Anne Quast Sander
1987 Kathleen McCarthy
1986 Leslie Shannon
1985 Kathleen McCarthy
1984 Joanne Pacillo
1983 Tammy Welborn
1982 Lisa Stanley
1981 Amy Benz
1980 Kathy Baker
1979 Mary Hafeman
1978 Beth Daniel
1977 Lauren Howe
1976 Nancy Lopez
1975 Debbie Massey
1974 Lancy Smith
1973 Katie Falk
1972 Debbie Massey
1971 Beth Barry
1970 Jane Bastanchury
1969 Jane Bastanchury
1968 Catherine Lacoste
1967 Dorothy Germain Porter
1966 Peggy Conley
1965 Barbara Fay White
1964 Barbara Fay White
1963 Barbara McIntire
1962 Carol Sorenson
1961 Anne Quast Sander
1960 Mrs. Ann Casey Johnston
1959 JoAnne Gunderson
1958 Barbara McIntire
1957 Meriam Bailey
1956 Anne Quast
1955 Patricia Lesser
1954 Claire Doran
1953 Claire Doran
1952 Polly Riley
1951 Marjorie Lindsay
1950 Polly Riley
1949 Helen Sigel
1948 Dot Kielty
1947 Louise Suggs
1946 Louise Suggs
1945 Phyllis Otto
1944 Dorothy Germain
1943 Dorothy Germain
1942 Betty Jameson
1941 Mrs. Russell Mann
1940 Betty Jameson
1939 Edith Estabrooks
1938 Patty Berg
1937 Marion Miley
1936 Dorothy Traung
1935 Marion Miley
1934 Mrs. L. D. Cheney
1933 Lucille Robinson
1932 Opal Hill
1931 Opal Hill
1930 Mrs. G. W. Tyson
1929 Opal Hill
1928 Mrs. Harry Pressler
1927 Mrs. Harry Pressler
1926 Dorothy Page
1925 Elaine Rosenthal Reinhardt
1924 Edith Cummings
1923 Miriam Burns
1922 Mrs. David Gaut
1921 Mrs. Melvin Jones
1920 Mrs. F. C. Letts, Jr.
1919 Mrs. Perry W. Fiske
1918 Elaine Rosenthal
1917 Mrs. F. C. Letts, Jr.
1916 Mrs. F. C. Letts, Jr.
1915 Elaine Rosenthal
1914 Mrs. H. D. Hammond
1913 Myra B. Helmer
1912 Caroline Painter
1911 Caroline Painter
1910 Mrs. Thurston Harris
1909 Vida Llewellyn
1908 Mrs. W. France Anderson
1907 Lillian French
1906 Mrs. C. L. Dering
1905 Mrs. C. L. Dering
1904 Frances Everett
1903 Bessie Anthony
1902 Bessie Anthony
1901 Bessie Anthony

References

External links
Women's Western Golf Association
Past champions

Amateur golf tournaments in the United States
Women's golf tournaments in the United States